Rasquera is a municipality in the comarca of Ribera d'Ebre in the province of Tarragona in Catalonia, Spain. It is located at the feet of the Serra de Cardó close to Highway C-12.

The town is renowned for its basketwork and the production of "pastissets," a sweet pasty.

In 2012 the municipality voted to sign a 1.3 million euro deal with a cannabis association based in Barcelona, under which the municipality would lease land to the association to be used for growing the drug.

References

 Panareda Clopés, Josep Maria; Rios Calvet, Jaume; Rabella Vives, Josep Maria (1989). Guia de Catalunya, Barcelona: Caixa de Catalunya.  (Spanish).  (Catalan).

External links

Town Hall webpage
 Government data pages 

Rasquera
Populated places in Ribera d'Ebre